Felipe Javier Crespo (born March 5, 1973) is a Puerto Rican former professional baseball utility player, who played in Major League Baseball (MLB) for three different teams between  and . Listed at 5'11, 195 lb., he was a switch-hitter and threw right-handed. Crespo is the older brother of César Crespo.

Career
Crespo was originally drafted by the Toronto Blue Jays in the third round of the 1990 Major League Baseball Draft. He began his professional career in the minor leagues in 1991, and spent the next five full seasons there. Crespo reached the majors in 1996 with the Blue Jays, playing for them until  before joining the San Francisco Giants (-), and Philadelphia Phillies (2001). His most productive season came in 2000 with San Francisco, when he hit .290, with four home runs, and 29 runs batted in (RBI), in 89 games – all career-highs.

On June 7, 2001, Crespo hit two home runs for the Giants, while his brother César hit his first major league homer with the San Diego Padres, joining a select club that includes Aaron and Bret Boone, Héctor and José Cruz, Al and Tony Cuccinello, Dom and Joe DiMaggio, Graig and Jim Nettles, Rick and Wes Ferrell, and Kyle and Corey Seager. The seven sets of brothers hit their homers playing for opposing teams.

In a five-season career, Crespo was a .245 hitter (109-for-445) with 10 home runs and 68 RBI in 262 games, including 46 runs, 22 doubles, four triples, and nine stolen bases.

Following Crespo's MLB career, he played in Japan for the  Yomiuri Giants of the Central League.

See also
 List of Major League Baseball players from Puerto Rico

References

External links

Japanese Baseball Daily

1973 births
Living people
Atenienses de Manatí (baseball) players
Dunedin Blue Jays players
Fresno Grizzlies players
Knoxville Smokies players
Liga de Béisbol Profesional Roberto Clemente infielders
Liga de Béisbol Profesional Roberto Clemente outfielders
Louisville Bats players
Major League Baseball first basemen
Major League Baseball outfielders
Major League Baseball players from Puerto Rico
Major League Baseball second basemen
Major League Baseball third basemen
Medicine Hat Blue Jays players
Myrtle Beach Hurricanes players
Nippon Professional Baseball first basemen
Nippon Professional Baseball second basemen
Nippon Professional Baseball third basemen
People from Río Piedras, Puerto Rico
Philadelphia Phillies players
Puerto Rican expatriate baseball players in Canada
Puerto Rican expatriate baseball players in Japan
San Francisco Giants players
Syracuse Chiefs players
Toronto Blue Jays players
Yomiuri Giants players